The Bergordnung were the mining regulations or law enacted in order to exercise the royal mining rights or Bergregal in central Europe in medieval times.

See also 
 Bergrecht
 Bergregal

Literature 
 Hermann Brassert (ed.): Berg-Ordnungen der preussischen Lande., Cologne, 1858 (digitalised)
 Hubert Ermisch: Das Sächsische Bergrecht des Mittelalters. Giesecke & Devrient, Leipzig, 1887 (digitalised)
 Franz Johann Friedrich Meyer: Versuch einer Geschichte der Bergwerksverfassung und der Bergrechte des Harzes im Mittelalter. Eisenach, 1817
 Joseph von Sperges: Tyrolische Bergwerksgeschichte. Wien 1765 (digitalised)
 Aemil Steinbeck: Geschichte des Schlesischen Bergaues, seiner Verfassung, seines Betriebes. 2 Bände, Breslau 1857ff. (digitalised Vol. 1)
 Kaspar Maria von Sternberg: Umrisse einer Geschichte des Bergbaus und der Berggesetzgebung des Königreichs Böhmen. 2 volumes, Prague, 1836/38
digitalised Vol. 1-1
digitalised Vol. 1-2
digitalised Vol. 2
 Thomas von Wagner: Über die Chursächsische Bergwerksverfassung. Leipzig, 1787 (digitalised)

History of mining in Germany
Mining law and governance